

Grodzisk Wielkopolski County is a unit of territorial administration and local government (powiat) in Greater Poland Voivodeship, west-central Poland. It came into being on January 1, 1999, as a result of the Polish local government reforms passed in 1998.

As of 2006 its total population is 49,444, out of which the population of Grodzisk Wielkopolski is 13,703, that of Rakoniewice is 3,253, that of Wielichowo is 1,765, and the rural population is 30,723.

Neighbouring counties
Grodzisk Wielkopolski County is bordered by Poznań County to the east, Kościan County to the south-east, Wolsztyn County to the south-west and Nowy Tomyśl County to the west.

Administrative division
The county is subdivided into five gminas (three urban-rural and two rural). These are listed in the following table, in descending order of population.

References
Polish official population figures 2006

 
Grodzisk Wielkopolski